Sangmanee Sor Tienpo  (born March 20, 1997) is a Thai Muay Thai fighter, originally from Mancha Khiri, in the northeast of Thailand,

Sangmanee currently fights out of the PK Saenchai Muay Thai Gym. He has previously trained with the Sathian and 13 Coins Gym.

In 2012, Sangmanee was named Muay Thai Fighter of the Year by the Sports Writers of Thailand at the age of 15.

In July 2016, Sangmanee Sor Tienpo was ranked the #5 Super-feather weight ranked on Rajadamnern Stadium by muaythai2000.com

As of December 2020 he is the number 4 pound-for-pound fighter in the world according to The Nation.

Biography

Sangmanee started to train on the age of 6, influenced by his father, a former Muay Thai fighter who discovered the talent his son possessed and began training Sangmanee at home.

At the age of 15, Sangmanee moved to 13 Coins Gym in Bangkok, a Muay Thai camp who had trained several champions, including the legendary Saenchai PKSaenchaimuaythaigym, where Sangmanee became the main star of the gym since Saenchai left 13 Coins and created his own gym.

On April 6, 2012, Sangmanee won his first major title when he defeated Phet Lukmakhamwan to capture the Lumpinee Stadium 105lbs title at 15 years old.

Not long after, on June 6, 2012, he defeated Dedkad Por Pongsawan to win the Rajadamnern Stadium 108lbs title.

On October 11, 2012, Sangmanee added another Muay Thai title to his résumé by defeating Kudsakornnoi Sor Junlasen for the S1 110lbs World Championship.

The following month, on November 9, 2012, he outscored Prajanchai P.K.SaenchaiMuaythaiGym for the Rajadamnern Stadium 112lbs title.

On December 7, 2012, he attempted to challenge Superlek Kiatmuu9 for the Lumpinee Stadium 115lbs title but lost by decision.

In 2012, Sangmanee had won a total of four Muay Thai titles, three of which were coveted stadium titles, in a span of less than 10 months and at only 15 years of age.

On February 21, 2013, he started the year by defeating Inseekao Rachanon for the Rajadamnern Stadium 115lbs title.

On February 28, 2014, Sangmanee took part in the King Fighter New Lumpinee Stadium Inauguration 124lbs 4-Man Tournament. In the Semi Finals, he outpointed Superlek Kiatmuu9 to advance. Sangmanee would face Superbank Mor Ratanabandit in the Final to win the tournament.

On December 1, 2014, Sangmanee nearly lost his life when he was poisoned before his match against Thanonchai Thor Sangtiennoi.

Top King World Series
Following his rise to prominence in Thai stadium scene, Sangmanee found more success competing in the Top King World Series tournaments. Overall, while competing in the Top King World Series, Sangmanee went 10–0–1.

He made his Top King World Series debut at TK3 in Hong Kong on December 20, 2014, where he defeated Man Kwok by unanimous decision.

Sangmanee  later returned to compete at the Top King World Series on a long-term basis in 2017. On January 14, 2017, at TK12, he fought to a draw with future ONE Muay Thai bantamweight title contender Han Zihao.

ONE Championship 
On September 16, 2019, Sangmanee signed a multi-fight contract with the Singapore-based organization ONE Championship to compete in the all-striking ONE Super Series format.

Sangmanee made his ONE debut on November 8, 2019, at ONE Championship: Masters of Fate. His opponent at the event was Azize Hlali, whom he went on to defeat by unanimous decision.

Sangmanee returned to fighting in Bangkok with ONE Championship for the first time at ONE Championship: A New Tomorrow January 10, 2020. In his first fight in Thailand since signing with ONE, Sangmanee defeated Kenta Yamada by unanimous decision, dominating the fight with a high volume of left kicks.

Sangmanee faced Kulabdam Sor.Jor.Piek-U-Thai in the semi-finals of the ONE Bantamweight Muay Thai Tournament at ONE Championship: No Surrender 3. He lost by first-round knockout.

Sangmanee faced Zhang Chenglong at ONE 161 on September 29, 2022. He won the close bout via split decision.

Sangmanee faced Kulabdam Sor.Jor.Piek-U-Thai in a rematch on January 27, 2023, at ONE Lumpinee 2. He lost the fight via unanimous decision.

Titles and accomplishments
True4U Muay Thai
2017 True4U Lightweight 135lbs Champion.
Lumpinee Stadium
2014 New Lumpinee Stadium inauguration 4 man tournament 124lbs Winner
2012 Lumpinee Stadium Fighter of the Year
2012 Lumpinee Stadium Mini Flyweight 105lbs. Champion
Rajadamnern Stadium
2016 Rajadamnern Stadium Fight of the Year (vs Thanonchai Thanakorngym)
2013 Rajadamnern Stadium Super Flyweight 115lbs. Champion
2012 Rajadamnern Stadium Fighter of the Year
2012 Rajadamnern Stadium Flyweight 112lbs. Champion
2012 Rajadamnern Stadium Light Flyweight 108lbs. Champion
Onesongchai Promotion
2012 S1 World Championship 110lbs. Champion
Sports Writers of Thailand
2012 Sports Writers of Thailand Fighter of the Year (shared with Yodwicha Por.Boonsit)

Fight record

|-  style="background:#fbb;"
| 2023-01-27|| Loss ||align=left| Kulabdam Sor.Jor.Piek-U-Thai ||  ONE Friday Fights 2, Lumpinee Stadium || Bangkok, Thailand || Decision (Unanimous) || 3 || 3:00
|-  style="background:#cfc;"
| 2022-09-29 || Win ||align=left| Zhang Chenglong || ONE 161 || Kallang, Singapore || Decision (Split) || 3 || 3:00 
|-
|-  style="background:#fbb"
| 2022-08-02 || Loss ||align=left| Yodlekphet Orr.Atchariya || Birthday Pitaktham Super Fight || Songkhla province, Thailand || Decision || 5 ||3:00 
|- style="background:#cfc;"
| 2022-06-20|| Win || align="left" | Petchmanee Por.Lakboon  || U-Muay RuamJaiKonRakMuayThai + Palangmai, Rajadamnern Stadium || Bangkok, Thailand || KO (Left Elbow) || 4 ||
|-  style="background:#c5d2ea;"
| 2022-04-16||Draw||align=left| Lamnamoonlek Tded99 ||Sor.Sommai + Pitaktham || Phayao province, Thailand || Decision || 5 ||3:00 
|-  style="background:#cfc;"
| 2022-03-11|| Win ||align=left| Kongklai AnnyMuayThai || Pitaktham + Sor.Sommai + Palangmai || Songkhla province, Thailand || Decision || 5 || 3:00
|-  style="background:#fbb;"
| 2022-01-09|| Loss||align=left| Ferrari Fairtex || Channel 7 Stadium || Bangkok, Thailand || Decision ||5  ||3:00 
|-  style="background:#fbb;"
| 2021-11-26|| Loss ||align=left| Tapaokaew Singmawynn || Muay Thai Moradok Kon Thai + Rajadamnern Super Fight || Buriram, Thailand || Decision || 5 || 3:00

|-  style="background:#fbb;"
| 2021-03-12|| Loss||align=left| Rungkit Wor.Sanprapai|| True4U Muaymanwansuk, Rangsit Stadium || Rangsit, Thailand || Decision || 5 || 3:00
|-  style="background:#fbb;"
| 2020-12-11|| Loss||align=left| Capitan PetchyindeeAcademy|| True4U Muaymanwansuk, Rangsit Stadium || Rangsit, Thailand || Decision || 5 || 3:00
|-
! style=background:white colspan=9 |
|-  style="background:#cfc;"
| 2020-11-05|| Win||align=left| Rungkit Wor.Sanprapai || True4U Muaymanwansuk, Rangsit Stadium || Rangsit, Thailand || Decision || 5 || 3:00
|-  style="background:#fbb;"
| 2020-09-26|| Loss ||align=left| Tawanchai PK Saenchaimuaythaigym || Rueso Fight + Kiatpetch || Narathiwat Province, Thailand || Decision || 5 || 3:00
|-  style="background:#fbb;"
| 2020-07-31|| Loss ||align=left| Kulabdam Sor.Jor.Piek-U-Thai || ONE Championship: No Surrender 3 || Bangkok, Thailand || KO (Left Cross) || 1 ||2:45
|-  style="background:#fbb;"
| 2020-02-28||Loss ||align=left| Thananchai Rachanon || Ruamponkonchon Pratan Super Fight || Pathum Thani, Thailand || Decision ||5 || 3:00
|-  style="background:#cfc;"
| 2020-01-10|| Win  ||align=left| Kenta|| ONE Championship: A New Tomorrow || Bangkok, Thailand || Decision (Unanimous) || 3 || 3:00
|-  style="background:#cfc;"
| 2019-11-08|| Win ||align=left| Azize Hlali ||ONE Championship: Masters of Fate||Manila, Philippines|| Decision (Unanimous)|| 3 ||3:00
|-  style="background:#cfc;"
| 2019-10-05||Win||align=left| Rafi Bohic || Yod Muay Thai Naikhanomton || Buriram, Thailand ||Decision || 5 || 3:00
|-  style="background:#cfc;"
| 2019-09-12|| Win ||align=left| Yodpanomrung Jitmuangnon || Rajadamnern Stadium || Bangkok, Thailand ||Decision|| 5 || 3:00
|-  style="background:#cfc;"
| 2019-08-16|| Win||align=left| Yodlekpet Or. Pitisak ||  || Songkla, Thailand || Decision || 5 || 3:00
|-  style="background:#cfc;"
| 2019-06-26|| Win ||align=left| Tawanchai PKSaenchaimuaythaigym || RuamponkonSamui + Kiatpetch Super Fight || Surat Thani, Thailand || Decision || 5 || 3:00
|-  style="background:#cfc;"
| 2019-05-10|| Win ||align=left| Chujaroen Dabransarakarm || Lumpinee Stadium || Bangkok, Thailand || Decision || 5 || 3:00
|-  style="background:#fbb;"
| 2019-03-26|| Loss ||align=left| Tawanchai PKSaenchaimuaythaigym || Parunchai Birthday || Thung Song, Thailand || TKO (High Kick) || 4 ||
|- style="background:#cfc;"
| 2019-02-23|| Win ||align=left| Victor Conesa || Top King World Series - TK28 || Surat Thani Province, Thailand || TKO (referee Stoppage)||  ||
|- style="background:#cfc;"
| 2018-12-31|| Win ||align=left|  Martin Avery || Top King World Series - TK27 || Pattaya, Thailand || TKO || 2 ||  
|-  style="background:#fbb;"
|-  style="background:#fbb;"
| 2018-11-29|| Loss ||align=left| Yodlekpet Or. Pitisak || Rajadamnern Stadium || Bangkok, Thailand || Decision || 5 || 3:00
|-  style="background:#cfc;"
| 2018-11-08|| Win ||align=left| Nuenglanlek Jitmuangnon || Rajadamnern Stadium || Bangkok, Thailand || Decision || 5 || 3:00
|- style="background:#cfc;"
| 2018-09-22|| Win ||align=left|  Marlon Santos || Top King World Series - TK22 || Ko Samui, Thailand || TKO (Referee Stoppage/Left Kicks) || 3 ||
|-  style="background:#fbb;"
| 2018-08-07|| Loss ||align=left| Yodpanomrung Jitmuangnon ||  || Songkhla, Thailand || Decision || 5 || 3:00
|-  style="background:#fbb;"
| 2018-06-28|| Loss ||align=left| Yodlekpet Or. Pitisak || Rajadamnern Stadium || Bangkok, Thailand || Decision || 5 || 3:00
|- style="background:#cfc;"
| 2018-05-26 || Win ||align=left| Timur Mamatisakov|| Top King World Series - TK20 || Bangkok, Thailand || TKO (Doctor Stoppage/ Cut) || 2 ||
|- style="background:#cfc;"
| 2018-04-28 || Win ||align=left| Kim Dong Hwan || Top King World Series - TK19 || Mahasarakham, Thailand || TKO (Left Low Kick) || 2 ||
|- style="background:#cfc;"
| 2018-03-17|| Win ||align=left|  Awos Manso || Top King World Series - TK18 || Ayutthaya, Thailand || TKO (Referee Stoppage/Left Kicks) || 3 ||
|- style="background:#cfc;"
| 2018-02-10|| Win ||align=left| Kirill Smirnov || Top King World Series - TK17 || Guangan, China || TKO (Referee Stoppage/Left High Kicks) || 3 ||
|-  style="background:#fbb;"
| 2018-01-18|| Loss ||align=left| Yodlekpet Or. Pitisak || Rajadamnern Stadium || Bangkok, Thailand || Decision || 5 || 3:00 
|-  bgcolor="#c5d2ea"
| 2017-11-06|| Draw ||align=left| Panpayak Jitmuangnon || Rajadamnern Stadium || Bangkok, Thailand || Draw || 5 ||3:00
|- style="background:#cfc;"
| 2017-09-30|| Win ||align=left| Han Zihao || Top King World Series - TK16 || Fuzhou, China || Decision || 3 ||3:00
|-  style="background:#fbb;"
| 2017-09-09|| Loss ||align=left| Panpayak Jitmuangnon || Samui Fight || Koh Samet, Thailand || Decision || 5 || 3:00 
|-
|-  style="background:#cfc;"
| 2017-08-04 || Win ||align=left| Kaimukkao Por.Thairongruangkamai || True4U MuaymanWansuk, Rangsit Stadium || Bangkok, Thailand || KO || 3 ||  
|-
! style=background:white colspan=9 |
|- style="background:#cfc;"
| 2017-07-09 || Win ||align=left| Reza Momani || Top King World Series - TK14 || Chongqing, China || KO || 2 || 
|-  style="background:#cfc;"
|- style="background:#cfc;"
| 2017-05-27 || Win ||align=left| Ncedo Gomba || Top King World Series - TK13 || Chengdu, China || Decision || 3 || 3:00
|-  style="background:#cfc;"
| 2017-05-04 || Win ||align=left| Kaimukkao Por.Thairongruangkamai || Rajadamnern Stadium || Bangkok, Thailand || Decision || 5 || 3:00 
|-  style="background:#fbb;"
| 2017-04-06 || Loss ||align=left| Superlek Kiatmuu9  || Rajadamnern Stadium || Bangkok, Thailand || Decision || 5 || 3:00 
|-  bgcolor="#c5d2ea"
| 2017-01-14 || Draw ||align=left| Han Zihao || Top King World Series - TK12 Hohhot || Hohhot, China || Draw || 3 || 3:00
|-  style="background:#cfc;"
| 2016-12-21 || Win ||align=left| Kongsak Saenchaimuaythaigym  || Rajadamnern Stadium || Bangkok, Thailand || Decision || 5 || 3:00 
|-  style="background:#cfc;"
| 2016-11-30 || Win ||align=left| Changsuek Kiatsongrit  || Rajadamnern Stadium || Bangkok, Thailand || TKO (knees) || 3 || 
|-  bgcolor="#c5d2ea"
| 2016-09-14 || Draw ||align=left| Thanonchai Thanakorngym || Rajadamnern Stadium || Bangkok, Thailand || Draw || 5 || 3:00
|-  style="background:#fbb;"
| 2016-07-21 || Loss ||align=left| Thanonchai Thanakorngym   || Rajadamnern Stadium || Bangkok, Thailand || Decision || 5 || 3:00 
|-  style="background:#cfc;"
| 2016-06-09 || Win ||align=left|  Muangthai PKSaenchaimuaythaigym  || Onesongchai Fights, Rajadamnern Stadium || Bangkok, Thailand || TKO || 4 || 
|-  style="background:#cfc;"
| 2016-05-02 || Win ||align=left| Panpayak Jitmuangnon  || Jitmuangnon Fights, Rajadamnern Stadium || Bangkok, Thailand || Decision || 5 || 3:00 
|-  style="background:#cfc;"
| 2016-03-31 || Win ||align=left| Thanonchai Thanakorngym  || Onesongchai Fights, Rajadamnern Stadium || Bangkok, Thailand || Decision || 5 || 3:00 
|-  style="background:#fbb;"
| 2016-02-24 || Loss ||align=left| Thanonchai Thanakorngym   || Onesongchai Fights, Rajadamnern Stadium || Bangkok, Thailand || Decision || 5 || 3:00 
|-  style="background:#fbb;"
| 2016-01-24 || Loss ||align=left|  Muangthai PKSaenchaimuaythaigym  || Samui Festival || Koh Samui, Thailand || Decision || 5 || 3:00 
|-  style="background:#cfc;"
| 2015-12-23 || Win ||align=left| Saeksan Or. Kwanmuang || Rajadamnern Birthday Show, Rajadamnern Stadium || Bangkok, Thailand || Decision || 5 || 3:00 
|-  style="background:#fbb;"
| 2015-11-19 || Loss ||align=left| Thaksinlek Kiatniwat   || Onesongchai Fights, Rajadamnern Stadium|| Bangkok, Thailand || Decision || 5 || 3:00 
|-  style="background:#cfc;"
| 2015-10-14 || Win ||align=left| Thanonchai Thanakorngym  || Onesongchai Anniversary Show, Rajadamnern Stadium || Bangkok, Thailand || Decision || 5 || 3:00 
|-  style="background:#cfc;"
| 2015-09-04 || Win ||align=left|  Muangthai Por Lakboon || Kriekkrai Fights, Lumpinee Stadium || Bangkok, Thailand || Decision || 5 || 3:00 
|-  style="background:#cfc;"
| 2015-08-07 || Win ||align=left| Ayoub El Khaidar || West Coast Fighting || Lacanau, France || Decision (Unanimous) || 5 || 3:00 
|-  style="background:#cfc;"
| 2015-07-02 || Win ||align=left| Saen Parunchai || Tor.Chaiwat Fight, Rajadamnern Stadium || Bangkok, Thailand || Decision || 5 || 3:00 
|-  style="background:#cfc;"
| 2015-06-04 || Win ||align=left| Phet Utong Or. Kwanmuang || Rajadamnern Stadium || Bangkok, Thailand || Decision || 5 || 3:00 
|-  style="background:#cfc;"
| 2015-05-07 || Win ||align=left| Jompichit Chuwattana || Rajadamnern Stadium || Bangkok, Thailand || Decision || 5 || 3:00 
|-  style="background:#cfc;"
| 2015-03-30 || Win ||align=left| Phet Utong Or. Kwanmuang || Rajadamnern Stadium || Bangkok, Thailand || Decision || 5 || 3:00 
|-  style="background:#cfc;"
| 2014-12-20 || Win ||align=left| Man Kwok || Topking World Series - TK3 Hong Kong || Hong Kong, China || Decision (Unanimous) || 3 || 3:00 
|-  style="background:#fbb;"
| 2014-12-01 || Loss ||align=left| Thanonchai Thor Sangtiennoi   || Rajadamnern Stadium|| Bangkok, Thailand || Decision || 5 || 3:00 
|-
|-  bgcolor="#c5d2ea"
| 2014-11-10 || Draw ||align=left| Thanonchai Thor Sangtiennoi || Rajadamnern Stadium || Bangkok, Thailand || Draw || 5 || 3:00
|-  style="background:#cfc;"
| 2014-09-11 || Win ||align=left| Phetmorakot Teeded99 || Rajadamnern Stadium || Bangkok, Thailand || Decision || 5 || 3:00 
|-  style="background:#fbb;"
| 2014-08-14 || Loss ||align=left| Luknimit Singklongsi|| Rajadamnern Stadium || Bangkok, Thailand || Decision || 5 || 3:00 
|-  style="background:#fbb;"
| 2014-06-25 || Loss ||align=left| Thanonchai Thor Sangtiennoi || Rajadamnern Stadium || Bangkok, Thailand || Decision || 5 || 3:00 
|-  style="background:#fbb;"
| 2014-06-02 || Loss ||align=left| Thaksinlek Kiatniwat  || Rajadamnern Stadium || Bangkok, Thailand || Decision || 5 || 3:00 
|-  style="background:#fbb;"
| 2014-05-07 || Loss ||align=left| Thaksinlek Kiatniwat  || Rajadamnern Stadium || Bangkok, Thailand || Decision || 5 || 3:00 
|-  style="background:#fbb;"
| 2014-03-30 || Loss ||align=left| Sam-A Kaiyanghadaogym  || Charity Event for School || Thailand || Decision || 5 || 3:00 
|-  style="background:#cfc;"
| 2014-02-28 || Win ||align=left| Superbank Mor Ratanabandit  || Lumpinee Stadium King Fighter 4 man tournament, Final|| Bangkok, Thailand || Decision || 3 || 3:00 
|-
! style=background:white colspan=9 |
|-  style="background:#cfc;"
| 2014-02-28 || Win ||align=left| Superlek Kiatmuu9  || Lumpinee Stadium King Fighter 4 man tournament, Semi Finals|| Bangkok, Thailand || Decision || 3 || 3:00 
|-  style="background:#fbb;"
| 2013-11-06 || Loss ||align=left| Superbank Mor Ratanabandit  || Rajadamnern Stadium || Bangkok, Thailand || Decision || 5 || 3:00 
|-  style="background:#cfc;"
| 2013-09-11|| Win ||align=left| Lamnammoon Sakchaichote|| Rajadamnern Stadium || Bangkok, Thailand || Decision || 5 || 3:00
|-  style="background:#cfc;"
| 2013-08-05|| Win ||align=left| Lamnammoon Sakchaichote|| Rajadamnern Stadium || Bangkok, Thailand || Decision || 5 || 3:00
|-  style="background:#cfc;"
| 2013-07-09|| Win ||align=left| Mongkolchai Kwaitonggym|| Lumpinee Stadium || Bangkok, Thailand || KO (Left Body Knee)|| 4 || 3:00
|-  style="background:#cfc;"
| 2013-06-03|| Win ||align=left| Chatchainoi GardenSeaview || Rajadamnern Stadium || Bangkok, Thailand || Decision || 5 || 3:00
|-  style="background:#cfc;"
| 2013-05-10|| Win ||align=left| Wanchana Or Boonchuay || Lumpinee Stadium || Bangkok, Thailand || Decision || 5 || 3:00
|-  style="background:#cfc;"
| 2013-04-05|| Win ||align=left| Prajanchai P.K.Saenchaimuaythaigym || Lumpinee Stadium || Bangkok, Thailand || Decision || 5 || 3:00
|-  style="background:#cfc;"
| 2013-02-21|| Win ||align=left| Inseekao Rachanon|| Rajadamnern Stadium || Bangkok, Thailand || Decision || 5 || 3:00
|-
! style=background:white colspan=9 |
|-  style="background:#fbb;"
| 2012-12-07 || Loss ||align=left| Superlek Kiatmuu9  || Lumpinee Stadium || Bangkok, Thailand || Decision || 5 || 3:00 
|-
! style=background:white colspan=9 |
|-  style="background:#cfc;"
| 2012-11-09|| Win ||align=left| Prajanchai P.K.Saenchaimuaythaigym || Lumpinee Stadium || Bangkok, Thailand || Decision || 5 || 3:00
|-
! style=background:white colspan=9 |
|-  style="background:#cfc;"
| 2012-10-11|| Win ||align=left| Kudsakornnoi Sor Junlasen || Rajadamnern Stadium || Bangkok, Thailand || Decision || 5 || 3:00
|-
! style=background:white colspan=9 |
|-  style="background:#cfc;"
| 2012-09-17|| Win ||align=left| Ruengsak Sitniwat || Rajadamnern Stadium || Bangkok, Thailand || KO || 3 || 3:00
|-  style="background:#cfc;"
| 2012-08-24|| Win ||align=left| Phet Aikbangzai || Lumpinee Stadium || Bangkok, Thailand || Decision || 5 || 3:00
|-  style="background:#cfc;"
| 2012-07-26|| Win ||align=left| Nikhomlek Tor Tawat || Rajadamnern Stadium || Bangkok, Thailand || Decision || 5 || 3:00
|-  style="background:#cfc;"
| 2012-06-28|| Win ||align=left| Dedkad Por Pongsawan || Rajadamnern Stadium || Bangkok, Thailand || Decision || 5 || 3:00
|-  style="background:#cfc;"
| 2012-06-06|| Win ||align=left| Dedkad Por Pongsawan || Wansongchai Fights, Rajadamnern Stadium || Bangkok, Thailand || Decision || 5 || 3:00
|-
! style=background:white colspan=9 |
|-  style="background:#cfc;"
| 2012-04-30|| Win ||align=left| Kanongsuek Sor Sritong || Rajadamnern Stadium || Bangkok, Thailand || Decision || 5 || 3:00
|-  style="background:#cfc;"
| 2012-04-06|| Win ||align=left| Phet Lukmakhamwan || Lumpinee Stadium || Bangkok, Thailand || Decision || 5 || 3:00
|-
! style=background:white colspan=9 |
|-  style="background:#fbb;"
| 2012-03-08 || Loss ||align=left| Nikhomlek Tor Tawat || Omnoi Stadium || Bangkok, Thailand || Decision || 5 || 3:00 
|-  style="background:#cfc;"
| 2012-02-11|| Win ||align=left| Phet Lukmakhamwan || Omnoi Stadium || Bangkok, Thailand || Decision || 5 || 3:00
|-  style="background:#fbb;"
| 2012-01-18|| Loss ||align=left| Phet Lukmakhamwan || Rajadamnern Stadium || Bangkok, Thailand || Decision || 5 || 3:00
|-  style="background:#cfc;"
| 2011-04-29|| Win ||align=left| Phanpichit Popbangkruay ||Lumpinee Stadium || Bangkok, Thailand || Decision || 5 || 3:00
|-  style="background:#cfc;"
| 2011-03-15|| Win ||align=left| Cherry Sitdarpauan ||Lumpinee Stadium || Bangkok, Thailand || Decision || 5 || 3:00
|-  style="background:#cfc;"
| 2011-01-20|| Win ||align=left| Dej Sor.Ploenjit ||Rajadamnern Stadium || Bangkok, Thailand || Decision || 5 || 3:00
|-  style="background:#fbb;"
| 2010-12-24|| Loss ||align=left| Klasiam Sor.Jor.Montree ||Rajadamnern Stadium || Bangkok, Thailand || Decision || 5 || 3:00
|-  style="background:#cfc;"
| 2010-10-22|| Win ||align=left|  Banlantong Ror.Kilacorath ||Lumpinee Stadium || Bangkok, Thailand || Decision || 5 || 3:00
|-  style="background:#c5d2ea;"
| 2010-09-15|| Draw||align=left| Dej Sor.Ploenjit ||Rajadamnern Stadium || Bangkok, Thailand || Decision || 5 || 3:00
|-
| colspan=9 | Legend:

References

Sangmanee Sor Tienpo
Living people
1997 births
Sangmanee Sor Tienpo
ONE Championship kickboxers